Novak Djokovic defeated Guillermo Cañas in the final, 6–3, 6–2, 6–4 to win the men's singles tennis title at the 2007 Miami Open. It was his first Masters singles title, and the first of an eventual record 38 Masters titles. He did not lose a single set in the entire tournament.

Roger Federer was the two-time defending champion, but lost in the fourth round to Cañas.

Seeds
All thirty-two seeds received a bye to the second round.

Draw

Finals

Top half

Section 1

Section 2

Section 3

Section 4

Bottom half

Section 5

Section 6

Section 7

Section 8

External links
 Men's Singles draw
 Men's Qualifying draw

2007 Sony Ericsson Open
Sony Ericsson Open